Pseudophilautus hankeni, the Hanken's shrub frog, is a species of frogs in the family Rhacophoridae, endemic to the Knuckles Mountain Range, Sri Lanka.

Its natural habitats are high-elevation montane forests of Sri Lanka. It is threatened by habitat loss and climate warming. Pseudophilautus dilmah, which was discovered in April 2015 is described as sister taxon of P.hankeni.

References

hankeni
Endemic fauna of Sri Lanka
Frogs of Sri Lanka
Amphibians described in 2011